NotiCentro 1 CM& (Compañía de Medios de Información) is a Colombian programadora established in 1992. It was one of the few programadoras that survived the crisis of the late 1990s and early 2000s, doing so by creating a two-hour news block in prime time (horario estelar). Its main program is Noticias CM&, created by Yamid Amat and Juan Gossaín and aired on RTVC's Canal 1. The acronym with the ampersand was adopted in 1993.

See also 
Yamid Amat 
Juan Gossaín 
Canal 1

External links 
  Official Website

Television production companies of Colombia
Colombian television news shows
1992 Colombian television series debuts
1990s Colombian television series
2000s Colombian television series
2010s Colombian television series